Host cell factor 1 (HCFC1, HCF1, or HCF-1), also known as VP16-accessory protein, is a protein that in humans is encoded by the HCFC1 gene.

Structure 

HCF1 is a member of the highly conserved host cell factor family and encodes a protein with five Kelch repeats, a fibronectin-like motif, and six HCF repeats, each of which contains a highly specific cleavage signal. This nuclear transcription coregulator is proteolytically cleaved at one or more of the six possible sites, resulting in the creation of an N-terminal chain and the corresponding C-terminal chain. The final form of this protein consists of noncovalently bound N- and C-terminal chains which interact through electrostatic forces.

Function 

HCF1 is involved in control of the cell cycle as well as having regulatory roles in a multitude of processes related to transcription. Additionally, work in model organisms point to HCF1 as being a putative longevity determinant. Alternatively spliced variants that encode different protein isoforms have been described; however, not all variants have been fully characterized.

Mutations in this gene have been linked to disorders of the cobalamine metabolism.

Interactions 

Host cell factor C1 has been shown to interact with:

 BAP1,
 CREB3,
 GABPA,
 HDAC1,
 HDAC2, 
 MLL, 
 OGT, 
 PDCD2,
 POU2F1,
 PPP1CA,
 SIN3A,
 SP1,
 SUDS3,
 WDR5, and
 ZBTB17.

References

Further reading 

 
 
 
 
 
 
 
 
 
 
 
 
 
 
 
 
 
 
 

Kelch proteins